Quibi was an over-the-top American short-form streaming platform that generated content for viewing on mobile devices. To capitalize on mobile viewing specifically, Quibi provided "quick bites" of content that can be viewed in under 10 minutes, and the content utilized "Turnstyle" technology in order to dynamically switch between portrait and landscape viewing formats. On October 21, 2020, Quibi announced that it was shutting down, leaving the fate of its original programming in question. It was shut down on December 1, 2020.

Quibi's content fell into three main categories:
Movies in Chapters: Longer features broken into chapters of 5–10 minutes
Unscripted and Docs: Shows that are episodic in nature and are 10 minutes or less
Daily Essentials: Daily curated quick bites of news, entertainment, and inspiration in the 5–6 minute range

On January 8, 2021, it was announced Roku had acquired Quibi's entire library of programming, including those that were not released yet, for The Roku Channel.

Original programming
New episodes were released every weekday unless stated otherwise.

Drama

Comedy

Animation

Adult animation

Unscripted

Docuseries

Reality

Variety

Continuations

Daily Essentials

Lifestyle

News

Original films

Documentaries

Former upcoming original programming
All shows here will be moved to The Roku Channel unless stated otherwise.

Drama

Comedy

Animation

Adult animation

Non-English language scripted

Unscripted

Docuseries

Reality

Variety

Continuations

Daily Essentials

Lifestyle

News

Notes

References

Quibi